Robert L. McLendon Jr. was an American academic, and the former President of St. Johns River Community College based in Palatka, Florida.  He served as the President from 1972–2008, and his 36 year tenure made him one of the longest serving Presidents in the history of the Florida Community Colleges System. McLendon was instrumental in transitioning the school from a community college to a state college, leading it to becoming St. Johns River State College, as well as developing two more campuses in Orange Park and St. Augustine. McLendon graduated with his bachelor's degree from Florida Southern College. He received his master's degree and Doctorate from Florida State University.  McLendon had previously served as vice-president and dean of academic affairs at SJRCC before he was appointed President.

He died on April 26, 2022 at the age of 84.

See also
St. Johns River Community College
Florida Community Colleges System

References

External links
 McLendon's official bio
 Historical info about McLendon

Living people
Heads of universities and colleges in the United States
Florida State University alumni
Florida Southern College alumni
Year of birth missing (living people)